Shelton Derrick Robinson (born  September 14, 1960 ) is a former American football linebacker who played for two teams in a seven-year National Football League (NFL) career.

References

1960 births
Living people
American football linebackers
Detroit Lions players
Seattle Seahawks players
North Carolina Tar Heels football players
People from Goldsboro, North Carolina
Players of American football from North Carolina